Dhoraiya Assembly constituency alternatively Dhauraiya or Dhuraiya Assembly constituency is one of 243 constituencies of legislative assembly of Bihar. It is part of  Banka Lok Sabha constituency along with other assembly constituencies viz. Amarpur, Katoria, Belhar and Banka.

Overview
Dhoraiya comprises CD Blocks Rajoun & Dhoraiya.

Members of Legislative Assembly

Elections

2020

2015

See also
 List of Assembly constituencies of Bihar

Sources
Bihar Assembly Election Results in 1951
Bihar Assembly Election Results in 1957
Bihar Assembly Election Results in 1962
Bihar Assembly Election Results in 1967
Bihar Assembly Election Results in 1969
Bihar Assembly Election Results in 1972
Bihar Assembly Election Results in 1977
Bihar Assembly Election Results in 1980
Bihar Assembly Election Results in 1985
Bihar Assembly Election Results in 1990
Bihar Assembly Election Results in 1995
Bihar Assembly Election Results in 2000
Bihar Assembly Election Results in 2005
Bihar Assembly Election Results in 2010

References

External links
 

Politics of Banka district
Assembly constituencies of Bihar